Laurent Barbiéri (born 30 October 1960) is a French gymnast. He competed in eight events at the 1984 Summer Olympics.

References

1960 births
Living people
French male artistic gymnasts
Olympic gymnasts of France
Gymnasts at the 1984 Summer Olympics
Place of birth missing (living people)